The AN/FPS-27 Radar was a Long Range search radar used by the United States Air Force Air Defense Command.

Westinghouse built a Frequency Diverse (FD) search radar designed to operate in the S-band from 2322 to 2670 MHz.

System problems required several modifications at the test platform located at Crystal Springs, Mississippi. Once these problems were solved, the first of twenty units in the continental United States became operational at Charleston, Maine, in 1963. The last unit was installed at Bellefontaine, Ohio, a year later. All AN/FPS-27 radars were installed at sites which had AN/FPS-6, AN/FPS-26, or AN/FPS-90 height finder radars.  The 3-D functionality of the AN/FPS-27 was not available to the AN/FYQ-47 Common Digitizer for use in the Semi-Automated Ground Environment (SAGE) system.

The 3-D functionality was possible through the use of a "vertically stacked beam" radiating feedhorn into the parabolic reflector.  The received radar return was detected in a single or adjacent feedhorn which the radar receiver calculated a relative position in elevation.

In the early 1970s, AN/FPS-27 radar stations that had not been shut down received a modification (solid state receiver circuitry replacing vacuum tubes) that improved reliability and saved on maintenance costs.  The upgraded radars were designated AN/FPS-27A.

References

         AN/FPS-27, 27A @ radomes.org
  AN/FPS-27 @ fas.org
  Winkler, David F. (1997), Searching the skies: the legacy of the United States Cold War defense radar program. Prepared for United States Air Force Headquarters Air Combat Command.

External links

Ground radars
Radars of the United States Air Force
Military equipment introduced in the 1960s